The Retreat from Liberty: The Erosion of Democracy in Today's Britain is a book by Michael Moorcock published in 1983. It is a 95-page political pamphlet written to convince people to accept personal freedom and all the responsibilities that entails.

Dave Pringle reviewed The Retreat from Liberty: The Erosion of Democracy in Today's Britain for Imagine magazine, and stated that "This booklet is a must for all Moorcock fans, but I hope it is read by a much wider audience besides."

References

Books about politics of the United Kingdom
1983 books